is a former Japanese football player.

Playing career
Koizumi was born in Tochigi Prefecture on January 11, 1968. After dropped out from Kokushikan University, he joined Nissan Motors (later Yokohama Marinos) in 1988. He debuted in 1990 and he played many matches as center back and defensive midfielder. The club won 1990 JSL Cup, 1991 and 1992 Emperor's Cup. In Asia, the club won 1991–92 and 1992–93 Asian Cup Winners' Cup In 1995, he lost his opportunity to play and moved to rival club in Yokohama, Yokohama Flügels. In 1997, he moved to Japan Football League club Kawasaki Frontale. He retired end of 1997 season.

Club statistics

References

External links

Kawasaki Frontale

1968 births
Living people
Kokushikan University alumni
Association football people from Tochigi Prefecture
Japanese footballers
Japan Soccer League players
J1 League players
Japan Football League (1992–1998) players
Yokohama F. Marinos players
Yokohama Flügels players
Kawasaki Frontale players
Association football defenders